The 2020 season for  began in January at the Tour Down Under.  The Team rode Colnago bicycles (Colnago V3Rs and Colnago C64) mostly with rim brakes, Alexander Kristoff also used disc brakes.

Team roster

Riders who joined the team for the 2020 season

Riders who left the team during or after the 2019 season

Season victories

National, Continental and World champions 2020

Footnotes

References

External links
 

2020 road cycling season by team
UAE Team Emirates
2020 in Emirati sport